Vulcana-Pandele is a commune in Dâmbovița County, Muntenia, Romania. It is composed of four villages: Gura Vulcanei, Lăculețe-Gară, Toculești, and Vulcana-Pandele.

References

Communes in Dâmbovița County
Localities in Muntenia